Abisares (or Abhisara; in Greek Ἀβισάρης), called Embisarus (Ἐμβίσαρος,) by Diodorus, was an Indian king of Abhira descent whose territory lay in the river Hydaspes beyond the mountains. On his death in 325 Alexander appointed Abisares' son Curtis as his successor.

Alexander the Great
Abisares sent embassies of submission to Alexander the Great and Alexander allowed him to retain his kingdom with considerable additions.

Onesicritus said that Abisares had two huge snakes and Alexander had a great desire to see them.

Kingdom
Hazara (country), the Abisares of the Greeks, forms the North-western district of the Peshawar division. It was conquered by Arjuna. However, Stein identifies the kingdom of Abhisara with the tract of the lower and middle hills between the Vitasta (Jhelum) and Chadrabhaga (Chenab) including the state of Rajapuri (Rajauri) in Kasmira. The kingdom of Abhisara finds reference in ancient Indian texts also. In epic times and Buddhist times, it had formed integral part of Ancient Kamboja Mahajanapada. Old kingdom of Abhisara was basically situated in the Poonch, Rajauri and Nowshera districts of Jammu and Kashmir.

See also
 Taxiles
 Porus
 Cleophis

References

Other sources
Smith, William (editor); Dictionary of Greek and Roman Biography and Mythology, "Abisares", Boston, (1867)
Waldemar Heckel: Who's who in the age of Alexander the Great. Prosopography of Alexander's empire. Blackwell, Oxford 2006,  (excerpt online)

Alexander the Great
4th-century BC Indian monarchs
Year of birth unknown
325 BC deaths
Bactrian and Indian Hellenistic period
People associated with Alexander the Great